The Dumfries Cemetery is a historic cemetery in Dumfries, Prince William County, Virginia.  It is located on Mine Road near Cameron Street.  The cemetery includes graves of original pioneers of Dumfries from 1667.  It also contains unmarked graves from the Civil War.

Quantico Church

The remains of the Quantico Church are located at the Dumfries Cemetery.  The Quantico Church was built in 1745 of stone.

Notes

External links

Cemeteries in Prince William County, Virginia
Buildings and structures in Prince William County, Virginia
1667 establishments in Virginia